Brazza's martin (Phedinopsis brazzae) is a passerine bird in the swallow family, Hirundinidae. The sexes are similar, but juvenile birds have more diffuse breast streaking and reddish-brown edges to the feathers of the back and wings. The song consists of a series of short notes of increasing frequency, followed by a complex buzz that is sometimes completed by a number of clicks.

The range of this species falls within the African countries of Angola, the Republic of the Congo, and the Democratic Republic of the Congo. Nesting in burrows in river banks, it lays a clutch of three white eggs. This bird feeds on flying insects, including termites, and may hunt over rivers or open savanna. It forms mixed flocks with other swallows, but is readily identified by its combination of brown upperparts, streaked underparts, and square tail.

Although this little-known bird had been classified as data deficient by the International Union for Conservation of Nature (IUCN), it actually appears to be common and widespread, and it has been listed as a species of Least Concern since 2008. There may be some hunting of this martin for food, but the species does not appear to be facing any serious short-term threats.

Taxonomy 
The Brazza's martin was first described in 1886 under the binomial name Phedina brazzae by the French zoologist Émile Oustalet from a specimen obtained at Nganchu in the Ngabé District of what is now the Republic of Congo. This martin is now the only species placed in the genus Phedinopsis that was introduced in 1971 by the German ornithologist Hans Edmund Wolters. The genus name, Phedinopsis, combines the genus Phedina with the Ancient Greek opsis meaning "appearance". The species name commemorates Italian-born French explorer Pierre Savorgnan de Brazza, later to become governor-general of the French Congo, who collected the type specimen. This species was often called the "Congo martin", but this invites confusion with the Congo sand martin or Congo martin, Riparia congica.

Brazza's martin is a member of the swallow family of birds, and is classed as a member of the Hirundininae subfamily, which comprises all swallows and martins except the very distinctive river martins. DNA sequence studies suggest that there are three major groupings within the Hirundininae, broadly correlating with the type of nest built. These groups are the "core martins", including burrowing species like the sand martin; the "nest-adopters", which are birds like the tree swallow that use natural cavities; and the "mud nest builders", such as the barn swallow, which build a nest from mud. The species nests in burrows and therefore belong to the "core martins" group.

Brazza's martin is thought to be an early offshoot from the main swallow lineage, although the striped plumage suggests a distant relationship with several streaked African Hirundo species. Brazza's martin was previously included in the genus Phedina, although it is now included in its own genus Phedinopsis due to the significant differences in vocalisations and nest type from its relative.

Description 
This small hirundine has grey-brown upperparts with a somewhat darker brown head and white underparts heavily streaked with blackish-brown from the throat to vent. There is a brownish tint to the breast plumage. The flight feathers are blackish-brown and the bill and legs are black. The sexes are similar, but juvenile birds have more diffuse breast streaking and reddish-brown or buff edges to the feathers of the back and wings. This bird has no subspecies.

The song consists of a series of short notes increasing in frequency which are followed by a complex buzz and sometimes completed by a number of clicks. The song becomes increasingly loud, although the final clicks are quite soft. The song is similar to that of the banded martin, and does not resemble the Mascarene martin, suggesting unresolved taxonomic problems. The flight is variously described as heavy, or like that of a sand martin.

Brazza's martin can be distinguished from most other swallows within its range by the heavy streaking on the underparts. Although the lesser striped swallow also has white underparts with dark streaking, it is larger, has a deeply forked tail and a very different plumage, with dark blue upperparts, a red rump and a chestnut head. Compared to the Mascarene martin, this species is smaller, has a plainer back and finer dashing on the throat and chest, but there is no range overlap.

Distribution and habitat 
The distribution of the Brazza's martin was initially poorly known, and until 1922 the type specimen in the Paris Museum was the only recorded example of this species. A Father Callewaert then collected 20 martins near Luluabourg (now Kananga), and this bird is now known to breed in the south of the Democratic Republic of the Congo (DRC), the Republic of the Congo, and in northern Angola. There is one probable sighting from southeast Gabon.

In the breeding season this martin is found near rivers with the steep banks that are needed for the nest burrows. Suitable habitat occurs along lowland tropical rivers like the Congo or rivers with sandbanks in the highlands of Angola. The lowland habitats are a patchwork of dry, seasonally flooded and permanently wet woodland, and seasonally flooded savanna, and the swamp forests contain trees such as Symphonia globulifera, raffia palms and Mitragyna species, and the riverbanks are often lined with arrowroot. This martin seems to be able to adapt to open savanna habitats containing Hymenocardia acida, in which it will roost overnight when not breeding, and is therefore not heavily dependent on the neighbouring forests as long as the riverine breeding sites survive.

Behaviour 

As it sang, the male leant towards the female, which caused the still-folded wings and tail to rise relative to the body. The Brazza's martin nests in the vertical banks of forested rivers from July to October, at the end of the dry season but before the river levels are high enough to cause flooding. A small colony of four pairs was recorded breeding near a rocky outcrop on the side of a valley.

The Brazza's martin nests singly or in loose colonies with sometimes widely separated burrows. The nest is a small heap of soft material such as feathers or dry grass at the end of a typically  tunnel. The normal clutch is three white eggs. The eggs measure  and weigh . The incubation and fledging times are unknown, although as with all hirundines the chicks are altricial, hatching naked and blind.

As with other swallows, Brazza's martin feeds on flying insects, including termites, and may hunt over rivers or open savanna. It can occur in single-species flocks or with other swallows including barn swallows, lesser striped swallows, or rock martins.

Status 

There has been little ornithological research in this part of Africa, and until 2008 the Brazza's martin was classified as data deficient. It has a large range of  although the total population is unknown. Its extensive range and apparently stable population means this bird is classed as Least Concern on the IUCN Red List.

It is likely that this species is dug out for food by humans, but its small, dispersed colonies in firm soil suggest that it is a less rewarding target than the densely packed sandbank nests of species such as the African river martin and rosy bee-eater. Breeding colonies in river sandbars are liable to flooding, but neither natural causes nor hunting appears to be having a serious impact, and this species seems under no immediate threat. Its ability to use degraded habitats also aids its survival. The Brazza's martin is not a protected species in Angola, the DRC, or the Republic of Congo.

Citations

Cited texts and general references

External links 
 

Brazza's martin
Birds of Central Africa
Brazza's martin
Taxonomy articles created by Polbot
Taxa named by Émile Oustalet